Marotiri is a rural community in the Taupō District and Waikato region of New Zealand's North Island.  runs through it.

The community has an annual family agricultural day each November.

Demographics
The SA1 area is part of the larger Marotiri statistical area.

The SA1 area had a population of 111 at the 2018 New Zealand census, a decrease of 12 people (−9.8%) since the 2013 census, and an increase of 24 people (27.6%) since the 2006 census. There were 42 households, comprising 51 males and 60 females, giving a sex ratio of 0.85 males per female. The median age was 28.7 years (compared with 37.4 years nationally), with 27 people (24.3%) aged under 15 years, 33 (29.7%) aged 15 to 29, 51 (45.9%) aged 30 to 64, and 0 (0.0%) aged 65 or older.

Ethnicities were 78.4% European/Pākehā, 21.6% Māori, 2.7% Pacific peoples, 10.8% Asian, and 5.4% other ethnicities. People may identify with more than one ethnicity.

Although some people chose not to answer the census's question about religious affiliation, 59.5% had no religion, 32.4% were Christian, 2.7% were Hindu and 2.7% had other religions.

Of those at least 15 years old, 9 (10.7%) people had a bachelor's or higher degree, and 21 (25.0%) people had no formal qualifications. The median income was $40,700, compared with $31,800 nationally. 6 people (7.1%) earned over $70,000 compared to 17.2% nationally. The employment status of those at least 15 was that 51 (60.7%) people were employed full-time, 21 (25.0%) were part-time, and 3 (3.6%) were unemployed.

Marotiri statistical area

Marotiri had a population of 2,391 at the 2018 New Zealand census, an increase of 177 people (8.0%) since the 2013 census, and an increase of 81 people (3.5%) since the 2006 census. There were 843 households, comprising 1,236 males and 1,158 females, giving a sex ratio of 1.07 males per female. The median age was 35.0 years (compared with 37.4 years nationally), with 582 people (24.3%) aged under 15 years, 471 (19.7%) aged 15 to 29, 1,065 (44.5%) aged 30 to 64, and 276 (11.5%) aged 65 or older.

Ethnicities were 71.3% European/Pākehā, 40.5% Māori, 3.3% Pacific peoples, 5.6% Asian, and 1.5% other ethnicities. People may identify with more than one ethnicity.

The percentage of people born overseas was 13.3, compared with 27.1% nationally.

Although some people chose not to answer the census's question about religious affiliation, 59.2% had no religion, 26.6% were Christian, 5.8% had Māori religious beliefs, 0.5% were Hindu, 1.0% were Muslim, 0.4% were Buddhist and 1.3% had other religions.

Of those at least 15 years old, 174 (9.6%) people had a bachelor's or higher degree, and 480 (26.5%) people had no formal qualifications. The median income was $28,600, compared with $31,800 nationally. 219 people (12.1%) earned over $70,000 compared to 17.2% nationally. The employment status of those at least 15 was that 888 (49.1%) people were employed full-time, 333 (18.4%) were part-time, and 93 (5.1%) were unemployed.

Education

References

Taupō District
Populated places in Waikato